Anne Smith (born 27 September 1951) is a former association football player who represented New Zealand at international level.

Smith made her Football Ferns debut in a 3–0 win over a Switzerland on 8 December 1984 and ended her international career with 11 caps to her credit.

Smith made her final appearance in a 5–0 win over Papua New Guinea on 30 March 1989, she continued to be included in the squad as second goalkeeper behind Leslie King through the Women's World Cup finals in China in 1991.

References

External links

1951 births
Living people
New Zealand women's international footballers
New Zealand women's association footballers
Women's association football goalkeepers
1991 FIFA Women's World Cup players
Millwall Lionesses L.F.C. players
FA Women's National League players